Rekowo  (German Reckow) is a village in the administrative district of Gmina Wolin, within Kamień County, West Pomeranian Voivodeship, in north-western Poland. 

The village has a population of 30.

References

Rekowo